Hemmed-In-Hollow Falls is a single-drop waterfall located within the Ponca Wilderness Area of the Buffalo National River in northern Arkansas. According to the National Park Service, it is the "tallest waterfall between the Rockies and the Appalachians."

The waterfall is located in Hemmed-In Hollow, a small valley closed in on three sides by  bluffs. The area can be accessed from at least three different hiking trails; Centerpoint Trailhead and Compton Trailhead along State Highway 43 north of Ponca are probably the best choices for those wanting to park and hike in. Of the two, the latter offers the most direct access. For those floating the Buffalo River, the falls are an easy half-mile trek from the river trailhead and a three-mile hike from Kyle's Landing.

For most of the year the flow over Hemmed-In-Hollow Falls is subdued and during dry periods can diminish to almost nothing. As one looks upward, the water breaks into thousands of individual droplets. Wind swirling in the canyon causes the falls to continually dance about. During times of heavy rain, typically during late winter or early spring, water spills heavily off the cliff.

References

External links
National Park Service Website for Buffalo National River
Hemmed-In Hollow Falls Pics & HD Vid - good flow
Short video of the Falls from the base - low flow
Short video of the Falls from the top - high flow

Landforms of Newton County, Arkansas
Tourist attractions in Newton County, Arkansas
Waterfalls of Arkansas
Plunge waterfalls
Buffalo National River